The Department for Business, Innovation and Skills (BIS) was a ministerial department of the United Kingdom Government created on 5 June 2009 by the merger of the Department for Innovation, Universities and Skills (DIUS) and the Department for Business, Enterprise and Regulatory Reform (BERR). It was disbanded on the creation of the Department for Business, Energy and Industrial Strategy on 14 July 2016.

Secretaries of State for Business, Innovation and Skills  

The Permanent Secretary was Sir Martin Donnelly.

Responsibilities
Some policies apply to England alone due to devolution, while others are not devolved and therefore apply to other nations of the United Kingdom. The department was responsible for UK Government policy in the following areas:
 business regulation and support
 company law
 competition
 consumer affairs
 corporate governance
 employment relations
 export licensing
 further education
 higher education
 innovation
 insolvency
 intellectual property
 outer space
 postal affairs
 regional and local economic development
 science and research
 skills
 trade
 training

Devolution
Economic policy is mostly devolved but several important policy areas are reserved to Westminster.  Further and higher education policy is mostly devolved.  Reserved and excepted matters are outlined below.

Scotland

Reserved matters:

 Competition
 Customer protection
 Import and export control
 Insolvency
 Intellectual property
 Outer space
 Postal services
 Product standards, safety and liability
 Research councils
 Telecommunications
 Time
 Business associations
 Weights and measures in relation to goods

The Scottish Government Economy and Education Directorates handle devolved economic and further and higher education policy respectively.

Northern Ireland

Reserved matters:
 Consumer safety in relation to goods
 Import and export controls, external trade
 Intellectual property
 Postal services
 Telecommunications
 Units of measurement

Excepted matter:
 outer space

The department's main counterparts are:
Department of Enterprise, Trade and Investment (general economic policy)
Department for Employment and Learning (employment relations, further and higher education policy)

Wales

Under the Welsh devolution settlement, specific policy areas are transferred to the Welsh Government rather than reserved to Westminster.

References

External links

bis.gov.uk/ Archived Website

Precursor departments:
Department for Business and Regulatory Reform (BERR) Archived Website
Department for Innovation, Universities and Skills (DIUS) Archived Website

 
Business in the United Kingdom
Business, Innovation and Skills
United Kingdom
Government agencies disestablished in 2016
Innovation in the United Kingdom
Ministries established in 2009
United Kingdom
2009 establishments in the United Kingdom
2016 disestablishments in the United Kingdom